{{Infobox College baseball team
| current= 2023 Texas A&M Aggies baseball team
| name = Texas A&M Aggies
| founded = 1894
| logo = Texas A&M University logo.svg
| logo_size = 125
| university = Texas A&M University
| athletic_director = Ross Bjork 
| conference = Southeastern
| location = College Station, Texas
| coach = Jim Schlossnagle
| tenure = 2nd
| stadium = Olsen Field at Blue Bell Park
| capacity = 5,400 seating (~7,000 with standing room)
| nickname = Aggies
| national_champion =
| cws = 1951, 1964, 1993, 1999, 2011, 2017, 2022
| regional_champ = 1964, 1993, 1999, 2004, 2007, 2008, 2011, 2015, 2016, 2017, 2022
| ncaa_tourneys = 1951, 1955, 1959, 1964, 1975, 1976, 1977, 1978, 1984, 1986, 1987, 1988, 1989, 1991, 1992, 1993, 1995, 1997, 1998, 1999, 2003, 2004, 2007, 2008, 2009, 2010, 2011, 2012, 2013, 2014, 2015, 2016, 2017, 2018, 2019, 2022
| conference_tournament = Southwest Conference: 1986, 1989Big 12 Conference: 2007, 2010, 2011Southeastern Conference: 2016
| conference_champion = Southwest Conference1931, 1934, 1937, 1942, 1943, 1951, 1955, 1959, 1964, 1966, 1977, 1978, 1986, 1989, 1993

Big 12 Conference 1998, 1999, 2008, 2011 ''
|division_champion=SEC West Division: 2022}}

The Texas A&M Aggie baseball''' team represents Texas A&M University in NCAA Division I college baseball.  The Aggies have competed in the Southeastern Conference since 2013.  The Aggies play home games at Olsen Field at Blue Bell Park. The team is led by head coach Jim Schlossnagle.

History
Texas A&M baseball has compiled an all-time record of 2550-1427-42 (.634 winning percentage) through the 2014 season. The Aggies have won 20 conference championships (15 in the Southwest Conference, four in the Big 12, and one in the SEC).  Texas A&M has made 33 NCAA tournament appearances, advancing to the College World Series seven times, in 1951, 1964, 1993, 1999, 2011, 2017 and 2022. Texas A&M's long, rich history and tradition in baseball began in 1894. After a decade break, the program returned in 1904 and has competed every year since. With over 2,700 all-time victories, the Aggies have more wins than any other SEC program

The early years (1894–1958)

Texas A&M played its first baseball game in 1894. No games were recorded from 1895 to 1903.  Seventeen head coaches led A&M baseball from 1904 to 1958, including football coaches Charley Moran, Dana X. Bible, and Homer Norton.  During this period, A&M finished with a 626–469–27 record (.572 winning percentage), claimed seven Southwest Conference titles, and made their first trip to the College World Series in 1951.  In 1951, led by Beau Bell, the Aggies won a three-game series in the District VI Playoffs over Arizona and advanced to the College World Series.  In the 1951 College World Series, Texas A&M defeated Ohio State 3–2 in a first round elimination game to give the Aggies their first College World Series win.

Tom Chandler era (1959–1984)

Tom Chandler came to Texas A&M as an assistant to head coach Beau Bell in 1958.  He took over as head coach in 1959 and immediately won the Southwest Conference championship in his first year.  Over the next 25 years at the helm, Chandler led the Aggies to 4 more conference championships, 8 NCAA postseasons, and an appearance in the 1964 College World Series.  His teams finished 660–329–10 (.667 winning percentage).  Chandler was honored for his accomplishments by being inducted into the American Association of Baseball Coaches Hall of Fame.  His jersey is now displayed on the left field wall at Olsen Field in recognition of his contributions. Tom Chandler was born on March 19, 1925, in Greenville, Texas. He attended Dallas public schools and graduated from Adamson High School in 1943. He then attended Arkansas A&M for two years in the Marine V-12 program. In 1946, he graduated from the Marine Corps Officers School. He served as a member of the Marine Corps Honor Guard that presented the colors at the funeral of President Franklin D. Roosevelt in April of 1945.

Mark Johnson era (1985–2005)

Mark Johnson, an assistant under Chandler, assumed head coaching duties in 1985 and guided the program for just over two decades.  During that time, his teams put together a win–loss record of 876–431–3 (.670 winning percentage) and made College World Series appearances in 1993 and 1999.  Johnson's highly ranked teams and powerful offenses in the late 1980s and throughout the 1990s brought excitement and increased attendance to Olsen Field.  His #7 jersey hangs on the right field wall at Olsen Field in honor of his service to A&M.  Johnson's 876 wins are the most in Texas A&M history. Johnson led the Aggies to a 37–29 (.561) postseason record in 13 appearances.

In 1989, the Aggies put together a 58–7 record (17–4 in SWC play) and were SWC Co-Champions.  The Aggies won the SWC tournament and hosted a regional at Olsen Field, which included Jackson State, BYU, South Alabama, and #12 LSU.  The Aggies exploded in the first three games, outscoring their opponents 65–13 before they were upset by LSU twice, ending one of the most remarkable seasons in A&M history.  Despite not advancing to the College World Series, the Aggies finished the year #2 overall in the final Baseball America poll (behind Wichita State, winner of the CWS).  The Aggies defeated #3 Texas 4 out of 5 times (with 2 wins coming on walk off home runs), including twice in the SWC Tournament.

Johnson led the Aggies to the College World Series in 1993.  The Aggies won the Southwest Conference championship and swept through the Central I Regional in College Station (defeating Yale, Lamar, UCLA, and North Carolina) at Olsen Field to advance to Omaha for the third time.  A&M defeated Kansas, 5–1, for the 2nd CWS win in A&M history.  Notable stars on the team included Jeff Granger (who holds the single game strikeout record at A&M with 21), Brian Thomas, Chris Clemons, Trey Moore and Kelly Wunsch.

The Aggies again advanced to the College World Series in 1999, led by Daylan Holt, Steven Truitt, John Scheschuk, Dell Lindsey and Casey Fossum.  In the College Station regional, the Aggies lost to Long Beach State in game 2 before defeating Ole Miss and Long Beach State twice to advance to the Super Regionals, where they faced #17 Clemson.  The Aggies defeated Clemson in a best of 3 series, 2–1, earning the team's fourth trip to the College World Series.

Rob Childress era (2006–2021)

In 2006, Texas A&M hired Nebraska associate head coach and pitching coach, Rob Childress to take over the program. After struggling to a losing record his first year, Childress guided the Aggies to a 597–306–2 (.660) record, two Big 12 championships (2010 and 2011), one Southeastern Conference championship (2016), and College World Series appearances in 2011 and 2017. Childress led the Aggies to the postseason 13 years in a row (2007–2019, the longest streak in Aggie history).

The Aggies advanced to the 2011 College World Series, led by Michael Wacha, Ross Stripling, John Stilson, Tyler Naquin, Jacob House, and Matt Juengel. A&M faced Missouri in the final game of the 2011 Big 12 Conference baseball tournament. Missouri took an early 6–0 lead. The Aggies fought their way back, and while down 9–8 in the bottom of the 9th, Gregg Alcazar would tie the game on a 3-2, 2 out, rbi single to send the game to extra innings. The Aggies would cap off the rally by winning it in the bottom of the 10th with a walk off home run by Andrew Collazo earning him the award of Most Outstanding Player. Jacob House, Kevin Gonzalez, Tyler Naquin, and Michael Wacha were named to the All-Tournament team. Texas A&M won the College Station Regional with wins over Wright State, Seton Hall, and Arizona to advance to the Super Regional at Tallahassee to face the 5th national seed, Florida State.  A&M won the first game 6–2 but was blasted in game 2, losing 23–9.  The Aggies would win the rubber match 11–2 to advance to the College World Series.  The Aggies lost to eventual champion South Carolina in a very close game, 5–4.

Following a 2021 season that saw the Aggies finish in last place in the SEC, Athletics Director Ross Bjork, announced that the school would not renew Childress' contract for 2022. Childress's 622 victories ranked 3rd in school history at the time of his dismissal.

Jim Schlossnagle era (2022 - present)
On June 9, 2021, Jim Schlossnagle was named the head baseball coach of the Aggies. The Schlossnagle-led Aggies had a regular season record of 35–17 and finished first in the SEC West in his first season at the helm, earning Texas A&M the no. 5 national seed. In the College Station Regional, A&M hosted Oral Roberts, Louisiana-Lafayette, and TCU. The Aggies and Horned Frogs met in the regional final with the Aggies beating Schlossnagle's former team 15–9 to advance to the Super Regionals and host the 12th seeded Louisville Cardinals. Texas A&M won both games against Louisville to advance to their 7th College World Series. In the College World Series, Texas A&M lost their opener to Oklahoma, 13-8, but won their next two games against Texas and Notre Dame to advance to the Bracket 1 Final against Oklahoma.

Stadium

The Aggies play at Olsen Field at Blue Bell Park, named in honor of C. E. "Pat" Olsen, a 1923 graduate of Texas A&M University and a former baseball player in the New York Yankees farm system. The field opened in 1978 and underwent major renovation after the 2011 season. Average attendance in 2011 was just under 4000 per game. The stadium hold us to 6100 people.

Head coaches

Year-by-year results
Information Source:

Texas A&M in the NCAA tournament
The NCAA Division I baseball tournament started in 1947.
The format of the tournament has changed through the years.

 Note:  In 1951, Texas A&M participated in the district playoffs, which they won, and moved onto the College World Series.  Prior to 1954, district playoff games were not considered a part of the National Collegiate Baseball Championship, and thus are not counted in Texas A&M's NCAA tournament record.

Texas A&M's first Team All-Americans

Players selected in the MLB draft
Note: the first Major League Baseball draft was held in 1965.

Other notable players

Rip Collins (1896–1968), played in the American League from 1920 to 1931
Pat Hubert (1926–2006), 1951 collegiate All-American, later played two years in minor league baseball
Jim Kendrick (1893–1941), two-time NFL champion (1922, 1927)
Wally Moon (1930–2018), played in the National League from 1954 to 1965
Topper Rigney (1897–1972), played in the American League from 1922 to 1927

See also
List of NCAA Division I baseball programs

References

External links